The 2012 West Coast Conference men's basketball tournament was held February 29 though March 5 at the Orleans Arena in the Las Vegas-area community of Paradise, Nevada.

Format
With the addition of BYU to the conference, a new format was introduced for the 2012 tournament.  The tournament began on Wednesday instead of Friday, and a first round 8 vs. 9 seed game was added. The 8/9 game was streamed live on wccsports.com on Wednesday, 29 February. The second round took place on Thursday, 1 March with #5 San Francisco playing the winner of the 8/9 game and #6 San Diego playing #7 Pepperdine. BYUtv Sports broadcast the second round of the tournament. The tournament quarterfinals were held on Friday, 2 March, and were broadcast on ESPNU. They featured #3 BYU against the 6/7 game winner and #4 Loyola Marymount against the 5/8/9 winner. The conference semifinals were held on Saturday, 3 March, and were broadcast on ESPN2. #1 Saint Mary's played the 4/5/8/9 winner and #2 Gonzaga played the 3/6/7 winner. The championship game was played on Monday, 5 March 2012 and was broadcast on television by ESPN and on national radio by Dial Global Sports, formerly Westwood One.

Seeds

Schedule

Bracket and Scores

Game Summaries

All tournament conference team

See also
 2012 West Coast Conference women's basketball tournament

References

Tournament
West Coast Conference men's basketball tournament
West Coast Athletic Conference men's basketball tournament
West Coast Athletic Conference men's basketball tournament
West Coast Athletic Conference men's basketball tournament
Basketball competitions in the Las Vegas Valley
College basketball tournaments in Nevada
College sports tournaments in Nevada